Paola Bonizzoni is an Italian computer scientist. She is a professor of computer science at the Università di Milano-Bicocca. Her research areas include computational complexity, graph algorithms,
computational biology, and bioinformatics.

Career
Bonizzoni studied computer science at the University of Milan where she graduated in 1988 and obtained a doctorate in 1993 under the supervision of Andrzej Ehrenfeucht, Giancarlo Mauri, and Grzegorz Rozenberg. She worked at the University of Milan while holding visiting positions at the University of Colorado Boulder, UC Davis, and McMaster University. Since 1998, she has been affiliated with the Università di Milano-Bicocca where she was promoted to professor in 2007. Since 2018, she has been a member of  the Academic Senate of the University of Milano-Bicocca.

Bonizzoni is Managing Editor of the journal Computability and editor of the book series Theory and Application of Computability. From 2016 to 2020, she served as the third President of the Association Computability in Europe. As of 2020, she is a member of the Association Council.

References

External links 
 

Italian women computer scientists
Italian computer scientists
Living people
Year of birth missing (living people)
Place of birth missing (living people)
Academic staff of the University of Milano-Bicocca
University of Milan alumni
Computational biologists
Italian bioinformaticians
Women computational biologists